In evolutionary biology, the Baldwin effect, a phenotype-first theory of evolution, describes the effect of learned behaviour on evolution. James Mark Baldwin and others suggested during the eclipse of Darwinism in the late 19th century that an organism's ability to learn new behaviours (e.g. to acclimatise to a new stressor) will affect its reproductive success and will therefore have an effect on the genetic makeup of its species through natural selection. Though this process appears similar to Lamarckism, that view proposes that living things inherited their parents' acquired characteristics. The Baldwin effect has been independently proposed several times, and today it is generally recognized as part of the modern synthesis.

"A New Factor in Evolution"

The effect, then unnamed, was put forward in 1896 in a paper "A New Factor in Evolution" by the American psychologist James Mark Baldwin, with a second paper in 1897. The paper proposed a mechanism for specific selection for general learning ability. As the historian of science Robert Richards explains:

Selected offspring would tend to have an increased capacity for learning new skills rather than being confined to genetically coded, relatively fixed abilities. In effect, it places emphasis on the fact that the sustained behaviour of a species or group can shape the evolution of that species. The "Baldwin effect" is better understood in evolutionary developmental biology literature as a scenario in which a character or trait change occurring in an organism as a result of its interaction with its environment becomes gradually assimilated into its developmental genetic or epigenetic repertoire. In the words of the philosopher of science Daniel Dennett:

An update to the Baldwin effect was developed by Jean Piaget, Paul Weiss, and Conrad Waddington in the 1960s–1970s. This new version included an explicit role for the social in shaping subsequent natural change in humans (both evolutionary and developmental), with reference to alterations of selection pressures.

Subsequent research shows that Baldwin was not the first to identify the process; Douglas Spalding mentioned it in 1873.

Controversy and acceptance

Initially Baldwin's ideas were not incompatible with the prevailing, but uncertain, ideas about the mechanism of transmission of hereditary information and at least two other biologists put forward very similar ideas in 1896. In 1901, Maurice Maeterlinck referred to behavioural adaptations to prevailing climates in different species of bees as "what had merely been an idea, therefore, and opposed to instinct, has thus by slow degrees become an instinctive habit". The Baldwin effect theory subsequently became more controversial, with scholars divided between "Baldwin boosters" and "Baldwin skeptics". The theory was first called the "Baldwin effect" by George Gaylord Simpson in 1953. Simpson "admitted that the idea was theoretically consistent, that is, not inconsistent with the modern synthesis", but he doubted that the phenomenon occurred very often, or if so, could be proven to occur. In his discussion of the reception of the Baldwin-effect theory Simpson points out that the theory appears to provide a reconciliation between a neo-Darwinian and a neo-Lamarckian approach and that "Mendelism and later genetic theory so conclusively ruled out the extreme neo-Lamarckian position that reconciliation came to seem unnecessary". In 1942, the evolutionary biologist Julian Huxley promoted the Baldwin effect as part of the modern synthesis, saying the concept had been unduly neglected by evolutionists.

In the 1960s, the evolutionary biologist Ernst Mayr contended that the Baldwin effect theory was untenable because
 the argument is stated in terms of the individual genotype, whereas what is really exposed to the selection pressure is a phenotypically and genetically variable population;
 it is not sufficiently emphasized that the degree of modification of the phenotype is in itself genetically controlled;
 it is assumed that phenotypic rigidity is selectively superior to phenotypic flexibility.

In 1987 Geoffrey Hinton and Steven Nowlan demonstrated by computer simulation that learning can accelerate evolution, and they associated this with the Baldwin effect.

Paul Griffiths suggests two reasons for the continuing interest in the Baldwin effect. The first is the role mind is understood to play in the effect. The second is the connection between development and evolution in the effect. Baldwin's account of how neurophysiological and conscious mental factors may contribute to the effect brings into focus the question of the possible survival value of consciousness.

Still, David Depew observed in 2003, "it is striking that a rather diverse lot of contemporary evolutionary theorists, most of whom regard themselves as supporters of the Modern Synthesis, have of late become 'Baldwin boosters'". These

According to Dennett, also in 2003, recent work has rendered the Baldwin effect "no longer a controversial wrinkle in orthodox Darwinism". Potential genetic mechanisms underlying the Baldwin effect have been proposed for the evolution of natural (genetically determinant) antibodies. In 2009, empirical evidence for the Baldwin effect was provided from the colonisation of North America by the house finch.

Comparison with genetic assimilation

The Baldwin effect has been confused with, and sometimes conflated with, a different evolutionary theory also based on phenotypic plasticity, C. H. Waddington's genetic assimilation. The Baldwin effect includes genetic accommodation, of which one type is genetic assimilation.

See also

Notes

References

External links
 Baldwinian evolution
 Bibliography

Evolutionary biology
Selection